Men's double sculls was an event in Rowing at the 1996 Summer Olympics in Atlanta, United States. The event was held at Lake Lanier between July 21 and July 27, 1996.

France, Norway, and Germany had won 11 of the last 12 World Championship medals and were represented at the 1996 Summer Olympics by Frédéric Kowal and Samuel Barathay, Kjetil Undset and Steffen Størseth, and Sebastian Mayer and Roland Opfer respectively. France, represented in part by Barathay, was the 1993 World Champion and 1994 bronze medalist. Norway was the 1994 World Champion and 1993 runner-up and, with its Olympic duo, the 1995 bronze medalist, while Undset was also an Olympic silver medalist from the 1992 quadruple sculls. Germany had been runner-up at the last two editions of the World Championships and a bronze medalist in 1993. The lone exception to the dominance of these three nations was Denmark, who won the 1995 World Championships with Lars Christensen and Martin Haldbo Hansen. Australia, meanwhile, sent one of its defending Olympic champions, Peter Antonie, to Atlanta with a new partner, Jason Day. Antoine was also one half of the winning crew at the 1995 Double Challenge Sculls at the Henley Royal Regatta. Hungary's Zsolt Dani and Gábor Mitring were the 1994 winners of that tournament.

In the opening round, Norway posted the fastest time by nearly five seconds, while the other heats were won by Denmark and the Italian duo of Davide Tizzano and Agostino Abbagnale, both of whom were Olympic champions in the quadruple sculls from 1988. The Hungarians, meanwhile, were eliminated in the repêchage. In the semi-finals it was France who eliminated the Australians with the fastest time in the round, nearly three seconds ahead of its closest competition, while Italy won the other heat. The race in the final was closer, but Italy, Norway, and France were all ahead of the pack and crossed the finish line in that order. Denmark, the reigning World Champions, came in fourth nearly five seconds later.

Medalists

Heats
SA/B denotes qualification to Semifinal A/B.
R denotes qualification to Repechage.

Heat 1

Heat 2

Heat 3
James Cracknell was one of the nominated British scullers but he was suffering from tonsillitis; Guy Pooley as backup rower replaced him.

Heat 4

Repechage
SA/B denotes qualification to Semifinal A/B.
RR denotes qualification to Rerace

Repechage 1

Repechage 2

Repechage 3

Repechage 4
The British replacement rower Pooley also replaced Cracknell in the repechage.

Rerace
FC denotes qualification to Final C
E denotes eliminated from competition

Rerace 1
The British rower Cracknell had by now recovered from his tonsillitis and took over from the replacement rower Pooley.

Rerace 2

Semi-finals
F/A denotes qualification to Final A.
F/B denotes qualification to Final B.

Semi-final 1

Semi-final 2

Finals

Final C

Final B

Final A

References

Rowing at the 1996 Summer Olympics
Men's events at the 1996 Summer Olympics